Saco is an unincorporated community in Somerset Township, Steele County, Minnesota, United States, near Owatonna and Hope.  The community is located near the junction of Steele County Roads 31 (SW 58th Street) and 32 (SW 32nd Avenue).

History
The community was named after Saco, Maine.

References

Unincorporated communities in Steele County, Minnesota
Unincorporated communities in Minnesota